Chen Bo (born January 1970) is the Ambassador Extraordinary and Plenipotentiary of the People's Republic of China to Serbia, replacing Li Manchang, since February 2019. Before that, she was ambassador to Bosnia & Herzegovina from 2015 until 2018.

Awards
 Order of the Flag of Republika Srpska, 2019

References

Chinese women diplomats
Ambassadors of China to Bosnia and Herzegovina
Ambassadors of China to Serbia
Chinese women ambassadors
Year of birth missing (living people)
Living people